Seberg is a surname. Notable people with the surname include:

Gregor Seberg (born 1967), Austrian actor
Jean Seberg (1938–1979), American actress